The 1996 Baden-Württemberg state election was held on 24 March 1996 to elect the members of the 11th Landtag of Baden-Württemberg. The incumbent grand coalition government of the Christian Democratic Union (CDU) and Social Democratic Party (SPD) under Minister-President Erwin Teufel retained its majority. However, the CDU chose not to renew the coalition, instead forming a new government with the Free Democratic Party (FDP). Teufel was subsequently re-elected as Minister-President.

The Republicans unexpectedly retained their seats with a small swing against them, despite polling indicating they would fall out of the Landtag.

Parties
The table below lists parties represented in the previous Landtag of Baden-Württemberg.

Opinion polling

Results

|-
! colspan="2" | Party
! Votes
! %
! +/-
! Seats 
! +/-
! Seats %
|-
| bgcolor=| 
| align=left | Christian Democratic Union (CDU)
| align=right| 1,974,619
| align=right| 41.3
| align=right| 1.7
| align=right| 69
| align=right| 5
| align=right| 44.5
|-
| bgcolor=| 
| align=left | Social Democratic Party (SPD)
| align=right| 1,199,123
| align=right| 25.1
| align=right| 4.3
| align=right| 39
| align=right| 7
| align=right| 25.2
|-
| bgcolor=| 
| align=left | Alliance 90/The Greens (Grüne)
| align=right| 580,801
| align=right| 12.1
| align=right| 2.5
| align=right| 19
| align=right| 6
| align=right| 12.3
|-
| bgcolor=| 
| align=left | Free Democratic Party (FDP)
| align=right| 458,478
| align=right| 9.6
| align=right| 3.7
| align=right| 14
| align=right| 6
| align=right| 9.0
|-
| bgcolor=| 
| align=left | The Republicans (REP)
| align=right| 437,228
| align=right| 9.1
| align=right| 1.8
| align=right| 14
| align=right| 1
| align=right| 9.0
|-
! colspan=8|
|-
| bgcolor=| 
| align=left | Ecological Democratic Party (ÖDP)
| align=right| 69,775
| align=right| 1.5
| align=right| 0.4
| align=right| 0
| align=right| ±0
| align=right| 0
|-
| bgcolor=|
| align=left | Others
| align=right| 64,105
| align=right| 1.3
| align=right| 
| align=right| 0
| align=right| ±0
| align=right| 0
|-
! align=right colspan=2| Total
! align=right| 4,784,129
! align=right| 100.0
! align=right| 
! align=right| 155
! align=right| 9
! align=right| 
|-
! align=right colspan=2| Voter turnout
! align=right| 
! align=right| 67.6
! align=right| 2.5
! align=right| 
! align=right| 
! align=right| 
|}

Sources
 Ergebnisse der Landtagswahlen in Baden-Württemberg 1996

1996 elections in Germany
1996
March 1996 events in Europe